Alan Lambowitz is a professor for the University of Texas at Austin in Molecular Biosciences and Oncology and has been instrumental in many bio-molecular processes and concepts, such as intron splicing and mitochondrial ribosomal assembly.

Education 
Alan Lambowitz was born in Brooklyn, New York on December 24, 1947. Growing up he attended Stuyvesant High School, a school specialized in science. Following high school, he attended Brooklyn College for his undergraduate degree in Chemistry. Upon completing this degree in 1968, Lambowitz promptly began graduate school at Yale where he continued his love for science in the laboratory. He received a Ph.D. from Yale and then decided to move his work to the Johnson Research Foundation at the University of Pennsylvania.

Career 
During his postdoctoral work, Lambowitz investigated a common mechanism of oxidative phosphorylation and discovered that the mechanism was incorrect. Lambowitz once again moved in 1973 to Rockefeller University. Here he had the opportunity to work with David Luck, a prominent name in the discovery of mitochondrial DNA. After a stint at Rockefeller University, Lambowitz pursued a fellowship at the National Institute of Mental Health, followed by an acceptance of a faculty position at St Louis University School of Medicine under the department of biochemistry. Here he took part in work surrounding Neurospora strains and examining the mitochondrial DNA that exists within them. In 1986 Lambowitz took a position with the Ohio Eminent Scholar and Professor of Molecular Genetics and Biochemistry at Ohio State University. A majority of his work here centered around mitochondrial plasmid DNA found within fungal strains. Upon returning to St. Louis, Lambowitz promptly began studying splicing mechanisms of ribosomal RNA processing systems. Although he’s not responsible for the discovery of splicing, the research that follows this within the bacterial community can largely be attributed to him, especially when regarding groups 2 introns. Lambowitz made the move to Austin, Texas in 1997 becoming the director of The Institute for Cellular and Molecular Biology there. Here he has cultivated a group of professionals that work on molecular biological research and received multiple merit awards in the process.

Honors and awards 
Lambowitz graduated Summa cum laude with honors from Brooklyn College. In 1995 he was named a Fellow of the American Academy of Arts and Sciences. Following this in 2001 he was named a Fellow within the American Association for the Advancement of Science. In 2004, he was named a Fellow of the American Academy for Microbiology and named a Member of both the National Academy of Sciences and the Academy of Medicine, Engineering and Science of Texas. Most recently he was awarded with the Wilbur Cross Medal by Yale University for his outstanding achievements in scholarship, teaching, academic administration, and public service.

Research and scientific endeavors 
Lambowitz has spent a majority of his career focusing on a very common bacteria known as Neurospora Crassa, or common bread mold. Through utilizing this bacteria as a research specimen, Lambowitz has helped pioneer many new theories as well as discount some older, incorrect theories.

Group ll Intron Research 
Much of the function of introns is still unknown to the scientific community today. This is precisely why Lambowitz focuses a majority of his research surrounding group 2 introns. Group 2 introns are a specific type of intron that is able to self-spice out of RNA segments and also are able to facilitate splicing and insertion into DNA in order to be replicated and passed on through ancestral pathways. These particular introns are especially important in understanding a variety of concepts within the microbiological community.

Lambowitz focuses on a variety of these concepts while in the lab, such as Group ll Intron reverse transcriptase mechanisms or RNA sequencing. One of the first concepts surrounding group 2 introns that Lambowitz began studying was their size and proliferation within cells. Group 2 introns specifically are often found in bacterial genomes, as well as in chloroplasts and mitochondrial genomes of eukaryotes. It was hypothesized that group 2 introns originated from proteobacteria that were incorporated into host genomes through the process of endosymbiosis. Once in the host genome, these introns went through a degeneration sequence, but promptly proliferated in large amounts after this degeneration. This allowed for the creation of an intron rich environment. Lambowitz and colleagues were able to determine that group 2 introns specifically were a longer form of intron, especially in ancestral form. This is specific to group 2 introns and is thought to be a result of their self-splicing mechanisms. Lambowitz furthered his research into group 2 introns, specifically exploring how these introns could help tell the story of ancestral bacterial lines using RNA sequencing. Along with colleagues, Lambowitz discovered that group 2 introns use a specific intron encoded protein in order to self-splice out of RNA. After understanding that these proteins serve to splice introns out of RNA, Lambowitz also discovered that the protein is capable of reverse transcriptase type functions in order to insert introns into host DNA. This discovery was crucial in understanding how these introns carried through ancestral lineage. Also, an important connection to know was the relationship between intron encoded proteins and the size of group 2 introns seen in host cells. When these introns are capable of encoding for their own intron encoded proteins the introns tend to be much longer.

Viral and Disease Utilization of Group ll Intron Splicing 
After laying the foundation for group 2 introns and the functions they provide, Lambowitz has branched off into using these mechanisms in order to discover ancestral lineage of bacteria, as well as to pursue research surrounding RNA Diagnostic approaches to disease identification. These aspects are crucial in developing faster disease recognition techniques, therefore saving more lives in the long run.

Reference 

1947 births
Living people
People from Brooklyn
Stuyvesant High School alumni
Brooklyn College alumni
Yale University alumni
Rockefeller University faculty
Ohio State University faculty
University of Texas at Austin faculty
Fellows of the American Academy of Arts and Sciences
Fellows of the American Association for the Advancement of Science
Members of the United States National Academy of Sciences